FC Spartak Tambov is a Russian association football club from Tambov, firstly founded in 1960. It most often played in the Russian Second League. It played on the second-highest level of the Soviet First League from 1960 to 1962. In 1972-1979 the team was called Revtrud Tambov. In 2014 it was dissolved due to bankruptcy. Tambov was represented professionally by FC Tambov until its dissolution in 2021. In July 2022, Spartak was reestablished by the Governor of Tambov Oblast. The club was licensed for the third-tier Russian Second League for the 2022–23 season.

The club's most famous alumni are Yuri Zhirkov and Dmitri Sychev.

Current squad
As of 16 January 2023, according to the Second League website.

References

Association football clubs established in 1960
Sport in Tambov
1960 establishments in Russia